In high-speed flight, the assumptions of incompressibility of the air used in low-speed aerodynamics no longer apply. In subsonic aerodynamics, the theory of lift is based upon the forces generated on a body and a moving gas (air) in which it is immersed. Under this assumption, air acts the same as water and is classified as a fluid.

Subsonic aerodynamic theory
also assumes the effects of viscosity (the property
of a fluid that tends to prevent motion of one part
of the fluid with respect to another) are negligible,
and classifies air as an ideal fluid, conforming to
the principles of ideal-fluid aerodynamics such as
continuity, Bernoulli's principle, and circulation.
In reality, air is compressible and viscous. While the
effects of these properties are negligible at low
speeds, compressibility effects in particular become
increasingly important as airspeed increases.

Compressibility (and to a lesser extent viscosity) is
of paramount importance at speeds approaching the
speed of sound. In these transonic speed ranges, compressibility
causes a change in the density of the air around
an airplane.

During flight, a wing produces lift by accelerating
the airflow over the upper surface. This accelerated
air can, and does, reach supersonic speeds, even though the
airplane itself may be flying at a subsonic airspeed (Mach number < 1.0). At some
extreme angles of attack, in some airplanes, the
speed of the air over the top surface of the wing may
be double the airplane's airspeed. It is, therefore, entirely
possible to have both supersonic and subsonic airflows
on an airplane at the same time. When flow
velocities reach sonic speeds at some locations on an
airplane (such as the area of maximum camber on
the wing), further acceleration will result in the
onset of compressibility effects such as shock wave
formation, drag increase, buffeting, stability, and
control difficulties. Subsonic flow principles are
invalid at all speeds above this point.

Sources

See also 
 Coffin corner (aerodynamics)
 Critical Mach number
 Drag divergence Mach number

Airspeed